Jean Jules Sepp Mvondo (born 23 April 1998), known as Jean Jules, is a Cameroonian professional footballer who plays as a central midfielder for Ekstraklasa club Górnik Zabrze.

Club career
Born in Yaoundé, Jean Jules joined Rayo Vallecano's youth setup in 2016, from Aspire Academy's Senegal branch. He made his senior debut with the reserves on 27 November of that year, coming on as a late substitute in a 1–1 Tercera División away draw against FC Villanueva del Pardillo.

On 19 November 2017 Jean Jules scored his first senior goal, netting his team's first in a 3–4 away loss against CD Móstoles URJC. The following 9 July, he signed for Albacete Balompié and was initially assigned to the B-side also in the fourth division.

Jean Jules made his professional debut on 17 August 2018, replacing Eugeni in a 1–1 home draw against Deportivo de La Coruña in the Segunda División. The following 15 January, he extended his contract until 2021 and was immediately loaned to Segunda División B side UCAM Murcia CF.

On 12 July 2019, Jean Jules was loaned to freshly relegated side CF Rayo Majadahonda, for one year.

On 1 September 2021, he was loaned out again for one year, this time joining Polish side Górnik Zabrze. On 23 June 2022, he was bought out by Górnik and joined the team permanently on a two-year deal.

References

External links
Rayo Vallecano profile 

1998 births
Living people
Footballers from Yaoundé
Cameroonian footballers
Association football defenders
Association football midfielders
Aspire Academy (Senegal) players
Segunda División players
Segunda División B players
Tercera División players
Ekstraklasa players
Rayo Vallecano B players
Albacete Balompié players
UCAM Murcia CF players
CF Rayo Majadahonda players
Górnik Zabrze players
Cameroonian expatriate footballers
Cameroonian expatriate sportspeople in Spain
Cameroonian expatriate sportspeople in Poland
Expatriate footballers in Spain
Expatriate footballers in Poland